James Cunningham (28 December 18794 July 1943) was an Australian politician. He was a member of the Australian Labor Party (ALP) and began his political career in the Parliament of Western Australia, serving as a state government minister. He later served as a Senator for Western Australia from 1937 until his death in 1943, including as President of the Senate from 1941.

Early life
Cunningham was born in Wirrabara, South Australia to parents who could not write, and he received little formal education there.  When he was about 20 he moved to Western Australia to become a goldminer.  He worked at Norseman and then at Boulder.  He contracted the disease silicosis through this work.

State politics
Cunningham was secretary of the Federated Miners' Union before his election to the Western Australian Legislative Council in 1916 as a Labor member. In 1922 he left the council, but in 1923 he was elected to the Western Australian Legislative Assembly as the member for Kalgoorlie. He was an honorary minister 1924–1927 and held the portfolios of Minister for Agriculture, Minister for Goldfields and Minister for Water Supply 1927–1930. His alcoholism prevented him being reappointed to the Ministry in 1933 when Labor regained office.

In 1936 the Labor Party decided to allow three candidates to stand for the seat of Kalgoorlie, after irregularities were discovered in the pre-selection ballotting process.  Cunningham was soundly defeated.

Federal politics
In 1937 he was elected to the Australian Senate as a Labor Senator for Western Australia.  In 1940 he was elected Deputy Senate Leader. On 1 July 1941 he was elected President of the Senate, serving until his death in Albury, New South Wales, on 4 July 1943. He was buried in Karrakatta Cemetery, Perth, after a state funeral.

References

Australian Labor Party members of the Parliament of Australia
Members of the Australian Senate for Western Australia
Members of the Australian Senate
Members of the Western Australian Legislative Council
Members of the Western Australian Legislative Assembly
People from Boulder, Western Australia
People from Norseman, Western Australia
1879 births
1943 deaths
20th-century Australian politicians
Australian miners
Burials at Karrakatta Cemetery
South Australian politicians